Sabine Sesselmann, or Sabina Sesselmann (13 August 1936 – 1 March 1998) was a German film actress.

Filmography

External links

1936 births
1998 deaths
German film actresses
20th-century German actresses